The South Croydon rail crash on the British railway system occurred on 24 October 1947.

The crash took place south of South Croydon railway station. Two electric commuter trains collided in fog and 32 people were killed, including the driver of the second train. It was the worst accident on Britain's Southern Railway.

The crash was a rear-end collision caused by a signalman's error.  The inexperienced signalman at Purley Oaks forgot about a train from Haywards Heath to London Bridge standing invisible in the fog.  The line was protected by the Sykes "Lock and Block" apparatus, which prevented him from allowing another train into the section until the preceding one had left it. However, he believed that the elderly apparatus was faulty and used a release key.  This allowed a train from Tattenham Corner to London Bridge into the same section, and they collided near South Croydon Junction.  The trains were crowded in the rush hour, carrying 800 and 1000 people respectively, hence the heavy death toll.

Similar crashes occurred at Battersea Park in 1937, Barnes in 1955 and Crayford railway station in 1959.

Notes

References 

History of the London Borough of Croydon
Transport in the London Borough of Croydon
Disasters in Surrey
Railway accidents in 1947
Railway accidents involving fog
1947 in England
Railway accidents and incidents in London
1947 in London
Accidents and incidents involving Southern Railway (UK)
October 1947 events in the United Kingdom
1947 disasters in the United Kingdom
Train collisions in England
Railway accidents caused by signaller's error